The Meadowbrook School of Weston is a coeducational, nonsectarian, independent day school for students in grades from junior kindergarten through eight. Meadowbrook is located on a 26-acre campus in Weston, Massachusetts, enrolls approximately 300 students, and employs 76 faculty and staff. The faculty:student ratio is 1:7.

History
The Meadowbrook School was founded in 1923 by Robert Winsor on its current grounds in Weston, Massachusetts. The Meadowbrook School was the continuation of Winsor's longstanding commitment to education in the greater Weston area, which began with the Pigeon Hill School in 1903. Winsor strove to improve the town of Weston through the development of its educational system. He donated the present land and collaborated with parents to design the school.

Over the past decade, the Meadowbrook School has broadened its academic scope, founding a middle school in 2001 and expanding its innovative, global curriculum. The school continues to modernize through new and improved facilities and technologies.

Facts
The Meadowbrook School was founded in 1923 and has approximately 300 students in grades Junior Kindergarten through 8. The school is located on 26 acres of land in Weston, Mass., and the grounds include five buildings, as well as athletics fields, tennis courts, swimming pools, and the "Woodyville" outdoor classroom.

Meadowbrook is accredited by the Association of Independent Schools in New England (AISNE). The school is divided between the Lower School, which includes Junior Kindergarten through 5th grades, and the Middle School, which is grades 6-8. Twenty-eight percent of students come from a diverse background. The school employs 70 faculty and staff with a faculty/student ratio of 1:7.

In 2011-2012, Meadowbrook's Annual Fund raised $1.25 million with 93% parent and 96% faculty participation. The school's endowment is $16.5 million as of September 2011.

Academics
Meadowbrook is known for academic rigor, and the curriculum encompasses language arts, mathematics, science, social studies, foreign language, and technology. In addition there is a focus on global education and social-emotional learning. As students progress through the grades, there is an emphasis on inferential thinking and sophisticated approaches to discussion, writing, and reading comprehension. Students are also given more choice as to which arts and athletics courses they take once they reach the Middle School. Meadowbrook has a variety of unique programs to aid in experiential learning as well as traditional learning.

Athletics
Meadowbrook offers a variety of athletic opportunities, from personal fitness and intramural play to junior varsity and varsity teams. All students are required to participate in sports/fitness, so that they learn not only about healthy lifestyles, but also about competition and sportsmanship. Athletic offerings vary depending on the season.

Fall Sports
 Soccer (Gender-split)
 Cross-country(co-ed)
 Fitness(co-ed)
Winter Sports
 Basketball(Gender-split)
 Squash(co-ed)
 Fitness(co-ed)
 Dance (co-ed)
Spring Sports
 Lacrosse(Gender-split)
 Baseball
 Softball
 Track and field(co-ed)
 Rock Climbing(co-ed)
 Tennis(co-ed)

If a student has an activity that conflicts with sports times, he/she can waiver, or not do sports, but only for one season.

The arts
Meadowbrook students take part in both performing and visual arts. The school's annual Fine Arts Night showcases students' two- and three-dimensional artwork and video productions. Parents and alumni are invited to view students' displayed drawings, collages, pots, and wooden carvings, as well as dance, choral, and musical performances.

Performing Arts
Junior Kindergartners through 5th graders have music classes that meet multiple times per week. Middle School students choose their own arts courses and also have the opportunity to participate in rock band, jazz band, and a school musical. Furthermore, they may pursue digital music production, set production, and lighting. Students are further encouraged to participate in the arts through weekly assemblies. The Halloween, Thanksgiving, and Holiday assemblies invite school-wide participation. Each grade has its own assembly, and the complexity of the performances increases as students progress, culminating with the middle school musical in which it is optional for any middle schooler to participate in, either by creating props or by acting in the musical.

Visual Arts
Meadowbrook's visual arts program relates to the curriculum of each specific classroom, striving to create a purposeful continuum between the arts and academics. The visual arts offerings encompass ceramics, painting, drawing, woodworking, sculpture, apparel design, film, and digital media arts. Junior Kindergartners through 5th graders have arts classes throughout the school week, while middle schoolers may elect visual arts classes from an array of offered courses.

Traditions

H.O.P.E.
H.O.P.E. (Helping Others Prosper Everywhere) is Meadowbrook's community service initiative. Student representatives from each grade meet to determine specific service goals and recipient organizations. H.O.P.E. activities include visits to assisted living/nursery facilities and local nonprofits as well as service projects on Meadowbrook's campus itself. Annual philanthropic events include Meadowbrook's dance-a-thon for charity, Pan-Mass Challenge bike-a-thon, the Meadowbrook Marathon for the Boston One Fund, and clothing and book drives for youth aid abroad.

Assemblies
Assemblies are an integral part of Meadowbrook's community-building efforts and typically take place on Friday mornings. Each assembly has a different theme and involves a different group of children. In addition to assemblies that are attended by the entire school, each grade has its own assembly during which they present different projects and performances to their parents and the Meadowbrook community. Notable assemblies include the annual Thanksgiving Assembly, Holiday Assembly, and Artists-in-Residence assemblies. The Thanksgiving Assembly at Meadowbrook welcomes the families of students, particularly grandparents and grandfriends, to the school on the Tuesday before the holiday. Songs and routines such as the "Turkey Tango" are performed yearly. Similarly, the Holiday Assembly, a.k.a. the “Winter Celebration” invites every member of the Meadowbrook community to congregate before school breaks for winter break. Children perform a variety of songs, such as the "12 Days of Christmas," "Reindeer Twist," and "Holiday Lights" with flashlights. The two or three annual Artists-in-Residence assemblies are open to children in 3rd grade and up and allow students to showcase a special talent that they may have. Meadowbrook assemblies unite students and their families.

References

External links 
 meadowbrook-ma.org

Private elementary schools in Massachusetts
Private middle schools in Massachusetts
Schools in Middlesex County, Massachusetts
Educational institutions established in 1923
1923 establishments in Massachusetts